The Belton Standpipe, in Belton, South Carolina, historically known as the Belton Waterworks Tower, is a 155-foot high concrete water tower located near the downtown area. Construction on the tower began in 1908 and was completed in 1909. It is the tallest of three standpipe water towers in the state.

The tower was listed in the National Register of Historic Places on November 5, 1987. A complete renovation of the structure began in 1989, and was completed in 1991.

It is an early example of water storage facilities using reinforced concrete construction, a material that would eventually become popular in the United States. The tank, located at the top of the tower, holds 165,000 gallons of water that flows through a 10-inch pipe located in the center of the tower.

References

External links

Industrial buildings and structures on the National Register of Historic Places in South Carolina
Towers completed in 1909
Buildings and structures in Anderson County, South Carolina
Water towers on the National Register of Historic Places
National Register of Historic Places in Anderson County, South Carolina
Industrial buildings completed in 1909
Water towers in the United States